Maria Lynch (aka Maria Barreto, Rio de Janeiro circa 1981) is a Brazilian artist.

Education 

In 2008, she earned an MA and a Post-Graduate Diploma from Chelsea College of Art and Design in London.

Work 

Maria Lynch works with a variety of media, including painting, sculpture / installations, performance and videos, in works which address excess in dealing with the female figure and the world of play. She creates a language that unfurls from fragments of memory and the abstraction of reality.

Among her main collective exhibitions are "The Jerwood Drawing Prize" London, 2008; "Nova Arte Nova" at CCBB, Rio de Janeiro and São Paulo, 2008. In 2009 she was invited to the "Salão Paranaense", Curitiba and presented the performance "Incorporáveis" at Oi Futuro and SESC 24 Horas, Pier Maua, Rio de Janeiro. In 2010, she was invited to the collective exhibition "] entre [" in the Galeria IBEU and won the Marcantônio Vilaça Prize, Funarte with exhibition at the MAC Niteroi. In the same year she was invited to the 6th Biennial of Curitiba, VentoSul. Maria also participated in the exhibition at the Barbican "Creative Cities" London Olympics, 2012 and also the exhibition "Bordalianos do Brasil" at the Calouste Gulbenkian Foundation in Lisbon, Portugal.

Among her most recent solo exhibitions are "Ocupação Macia" at the New Museum in 2015, which Maria had previously shown in an individual at Paço Imperial, Rio de Janeiro in 2012. "Aforismas, Rizomas e Selvageria", Anita Schwartz, Rio de Janeiro, Brazil 2015. "Janela Provisória", O grande Campo - Oi Futuro, Rio de Janeiro, Brazil 2015. "Time is Never Past Nor Present", curated by Sarah Crown at Spazio522, New York, USA 2014 and "Becomings" - Bathroom Project, Rooster Gallery, New York, USA 2014.

In 2014 was commissioned to the artist to do a work for the Getúlio Vargas Foundation in the new building of Oscar Niemeyer. In that year she released her book by Cosac Naif, entitled "Drawings". In 2014 she did an artistic residence at Residency Unlimited in New York. In the same year she won an award from the Brazilian Consulate in the US for the solo exhibition, "Ocupação Macia" who took place at the Ideas City Festival in New Museum, New York. She also presented a solo exhibition in the gallery Anita Schwartz, Rio de Janeiro, titled "Aforismas, Rizomas e Selvageria". In the year 2016 she did a solo exhibition called "Spaces and Spectacles" at Wilding Cran Gallery in Los Angeles. Maria Lynch began the year 2017 by opening her first solo exhibition at an institution in Brazil, titled "Máquina Devir" at Oi Futuro, Rio de Janeiro, Brazil.

The artist has works in important collections such as the Museum of Contemporary Art, Niterói, Brazil; Centro Cultural Candido Mendes, Rio de Janeiro, Brazil; Fine Arts Olympic Committee, London, United Kingdom; Gilberto Chateubriand Collection, Brazil / MAM-RJ, Rio de Janeiro, Brazil; Ministry of Foreign Affairs - Itamaraty Palace, DF, Brazil and Getúlio Vargas Foundation, Rio de Janeiro, Brazil.

Selected solo exhibitions

2017 Máquina Devir; Oi Futuro, RJ, Brazil
2016 Spaces and Spetacles; Wilding and Cran Gallery; LA, USA
2016 Ficções Sensoriais; Blau Projects, SP, Brazil  
2015 Janela Provisória, O grande Campo; Oi Futuro Rio de Janeiro, Brazil
2015 Ocupação Macia; Storefront For Art and Architecture at Ideas City Festival - New Museum, NY, USA 
2015 Aforismas, Rizomas e Selvageria; Anita Schwartz, Rio de Janeiro, Brazil 
2014 Time is Never Past Nor Present; Curated by Sarah Crown Spazio522, NY, USA 
2014 Becomings - Bathroom Project; Rooster Gallery, NY, USA
2014 Roda Viva; Galeria Roberto Alban, Salvador, Brazil 
2013 Acontecimento Encarnado; Curated by Ligia Canongia, Galeria Anita Schwartz, Rio de Janeiro, Brazil 
2013 Ocupação Macia, Galeria Murilo Castro, BH, Brazil
2012 Orgão sem Corpo, Galeria Marília Razuk, São Paulo, Brazil
2012 Ocupação Macia,  Paço Imperial, Rio de Janeiro, Brazil
2012 Incorporáveis (performance), Museum of Modern Art, Rio de Janeiro, Brazil
2010 W4, Galeria HAP, Rio de Janeiro, Brazil
2009 Devirneando, Galeria Mercedes Viegas, Rio de Janeiro, Brazil
2006 Retalhos, Galeria Candido Mendes, Rio de Janeiro, Brazil 
2005 Immanência, Galeria Tarsila do Amaral, Rio de Janeiro, Brazil

Selected group exhibitions

2014 Immediate Female; Judith Charles Gallery, NY, USA
2014 Cake, Dolls, Gift Bags and Other things; Radiator Gallery, NY, USA
2014 The Playground Of The Fantastical; Galerie Protégé, NY, USA
2014 This Exhibition Has Every Thing To Go Wrong; Abrons Center, NY, USA
2013 Bordalianos do Brasil; Fundação Calouste Gulbenkian, Lisbon, Portugal
2013 Aproximações Contemporâneas; Roberto Alban Galeria, Salvador, Brazil
2013 Videoarte 2013; Oi Futuro, Rio de Janeiro, Brazil
2012 Algum de Nós; Galeria Marília Razuk, São Paulo, Brazil
2012 Somatório Singular; Curated by Cristina Burlamaqui, Galeria Murilo Castro, BH, Brazil
2011 Bienal Vento Sul; Curated by Alfons Hug curadoria de 6º Bienal de Curitiba, Curitiba, Brazil
2011 Incorporáveis; SP Arte, Pavilhão da Bienal, São Paulo, Brazil
2011 Zona Oculta; SESC and Centro Cultural Justiça Eleitoral, Rio de Janeiro, Brazil 
2011 Black Tie; Galeria BNDES, Rio de Janeiro, Brazil
2011 Esculturas Flutuantes; Tocayo, Galpão da Arte e Cidadania, Rio de Janeiro, Brazil
2010 Incorporáveis (video); Presente Futuro Vol III, Oi Futuro, Rio de Janeiro, Brazil
2010 Arquivo Geral; Curated by Paulo Venâncio Centro Helio Oiticica, Rio de Janeiro, Brazil
2010 ] entre [ ; Galeria Ibeu, Rio de Janeiro, Brazil  
2010 Incorporáveis (performance); SP Arte, Pavilhão da Bienal, São Paulo, Brazil
2010 Estranho Cotidiano; Galeria Movimento, Rio de Janeiro, Brazil
2010 Liberdade é Pouco. O que desejo ainda não tem nome; Curated by Bernardo Mosqueira, Casa no Jardim Botânico, Rio de Janeiro, Brazil
2010 Incorporáveis (performance); SESC Arte 24h, Espaço Píer Mauá, Rio de Janeiro, Brazil
2009 Incorporáveis (performance); Oi Futuro, Rio de Janeiro, Brazil
2009 Nova Arte Nova; Centro Cultural Banco do Brasil, São Paulo, Brazil
2008 Jerwood Drawing Prize; Jerwood Space, London, UK
2008 Master’s Degree Final Show; Chelsea College of Art & Design, London, UK
2008 Nova Arte Nova; Curated by Paulo Venâncio, Centro Cultural Banco do Brasil, RJ, Brazil
2008 59 Seconds Video Festival, Landmark, Bergen Kunsthall, Bergen, Norway; Schauraum, Nurtingen, Germany; Artprojx Space, London, UK; University of Texas, Austin, USA 
2008 Condensation; Decima Gallery, London, UK
2008 Crouch End Open Studios; Town Hall, London, UK
2008 Collective Exhibition; Galeria Virgílio, São Paulo, Brazil 
2008 Abre Alas 2008; A Gentil Carioca, Rio de Janeiro, Brazil 
2007 Post-Graduate Final Show; Chelsea College of Art & Design, London, UK
2007 Inaugural show; Galeria do Convento, Universidade Candido Mendes, RJ, Brazil
2007 Group Exhibition – Salon Gallery, London, UK
2006 Arquivo Geral; Centro Helio Oiticica, Rio de Janeiro, Brazil
2006 Conexão Contemporânea; FUNARTE, Rio de Janeiro, Brazil
2005 Acessos Possíveis; Escola de Artes Visuais do Parque Lage, Rio de Janeiro, Brazil
2005 Evento Pirata (intervention on Rio-Niterói ferry), Grupo Py, Rio de Janeiro, Brazil
2005 Conexão Contemporânea; FUNARTE, Rio de Janeiro, Brazil

Awards, residencies and grants 

2016 ESXLA Residency Program LA, USA
2015 Grant for Solo Exhibition at Storefront for Art and Architecture by the Brazilian Embassy, NY, EUA
2013 Residencie at Residency Unlimited, NY, EUA
2013 Selecteted for a commission of Public Art, Fundação Getúlio Vargas, RJ, Brazil
2012 Guest artist by the London 2012 Organizing Committee, Creative Cities, Barbican, London, UK
2012 Residencie Bordalo Pinheiro, Lisbon, Portugal 
2012 Front Commission of escola de Samba da Pimpolhos Grande Rio, Sapucai, Rio de Janeiro, Brasil
2010 Montáveis Sculpture Workshop, Casa França Brasil, Rio de Janeiro, Brazil
2010 Marcantonio Vilaça Award, Funarte, Brazil
2009 Guest artist, 63rd Salão Paranaense, Museum of Modern Art, Curitiba, PA, Brazil
2008 Jerwood Drawing Prize, Jerwood Space, London, UK
2007 13th Salão da Bahia, Bahia Museum of Modern Art, Salvador, Brazil
2006 Novíssimos, Galeria IBEU Copacabana, Rio de Janeiro, Brazil
2006 Salão de Arte de Ribeirão Preto, MARP, Ribeirão Preto, Brazil
2004 Arte Pará, Rômulo Maiorana Foundation, Belém, Brazil

Public collections 

Ministério das Relações Exteriores, Palácio do Itamaraty, DF, Brazil
Coleção Gilberto Chateaubriand, MAM, Rio de Janeiro, Brazil 
Centro Cultural Candido Mendes, Rio de Janeiro, Brazil
Museu de Arte Contemporânea de Niterói, Niterói, Brazil
Committee for Olympic Fine Arts 2012, London, UK
BGA collection (Investment Fund), Brazil

References

External links 
Galeria Anita Schwartz
Galeria Roberto Alban
Blau Projects
Wilding Cran Gallery
Maria Lynch Website

1981 births
Living people
Artists from Rio de Janeiro (city)
Brazilian artists